There are nine administrative districts in the city of Baghdad, the capital of Iraq, that correspond to the nine district advisory councils. The Baghdad Security Plan used these nine districts as the nine security districts.
These were formed in 2003 following the 2003 Invasion of Iraq. District council members are selected from the 89 Neighborhood Advisory Councils in Baghdad. The number of neighbourhood representatives on the district council is based upon the community's population. The Baghdad City Advisory Council consists of 37 members drawn from the district councils and is also based on the district's population.

In the list below, alternate spellings (in parentheses) are from United Nations humanitarian info.org map listing 89 neighborhoods.

Districts east of the Tigris (Rusafa)

Rusafa District
 1. Sinek (Sinak), Al Rasheed
 2. Khulani, Al Wathba Square, Shorjah
 3. Abu Nuwas
 4. Orphalia, Bataween
 5. Al-Sa'adoon (Al-Saadoon) Park
 6. Camp Gaylani
 7. Sheikh Omar
 8. Medical City
 9. Bab Al-Moatham (Bab Al-Muadham)
 10. Mustansiriya
 11. Nile
 12. Hayy 14 July
 13. Idrissi

Adhamiyah District
 14. Adhamiyah
 15. Al-Wazireya (Waziriya)
 16. Al-Wazireya-Industry (Waziriya-Industry)
 17. Maghreb
 18. Qahira
 19. Gherai'at (Krai'at)
 20. Tunis
 21. Hayy Ur
 25. Rashdiya

Sha'ab District
 Sha'ab
 Al Baidha
 Al Bunook
 Al Tarbiyah
 Sumar
 Adan
 Al Jazaer
 Um Alkubur walghizlan

Sadr District (formerly Thawra District (Revolution District)
 26. Ishbiliya
 27. Habbibiya
 28. Sadr City (formerly Saddam City and Thawra City)

9 Nissan District
 29. Al-Shaab Stadium, Bor Said Square, Al-Shaheed Monument (Martyr's Monument).
 30. Al-Muthanna, Zayouna
 31. Al Ghadeer, Maysaloon Square
 32. Baghdad Al-Jadida (New Baghdad), Alef Dar, Al-Khaleej
 33. Habibiya, Dur Al-Umal, Baladiyat
 34. Mashtal, Ameen, Nafit, Rustomaniya (Rustomiya)
 35. Fedhailia, Kamaliya
 36. Al-Husseinia, Ma'amil, Al-Rasheed St.
 37. Al-Ubedy (Obaydi), Ma'amil 2

Karadah District
 38. Sinaa, Alwiya, Al-Wahda (Al-Wehda)
 39. Inner Karrada
 40. Zuwiya, Al-Jadriya
 41. Outer Karrada, Arasat, Mesbah
 42. Camp Sarah, Rasheed Camp Road

Al-Za'franiya District
 43. Alwaleed
 44. Rasheed
 45. Shoumoukh
 46. Orfali
 47. Seaidya
 48. Rabea'a
 49. Al-Rasheed Camp

Districts west of the Tigris (Karkh)

Karkh District
 47. Shawaka, Haifa (Hayfa) Complex
 48. Sheik Maaruf, Shaljia
 49. Salhia
 50. Karadat Maryam
 51. Um Al-Khanzeer Island, Presidential Complex
 52. Al-Kindi, Harithiya
 53. Zawra Park
 54. Muthenna Airbase (Old Al Muthanna Airport)

Kadhimiya District
 55. Utayfia
 56. Kadhimiya 1
 57. Kadhimiya 2
 58. Ali Al-Salih (Ali Al-Saleh), Salam
 59. Hurriya (Hurriyah) 1-5
 60. Dabbash
 61. Al-Shu'ala

Mansour district
 62. Qadissiya
 63. Mansour, Dragh, Baghdad International Fair
 64. Al-Washash
 65. Iskan
 66. 14 Ramadan
 67. Yarmouk (Al-Yarmuk)
 68. Safarat Complex, Kafa'at
 69. Al-A'amiriya (Al-Amriya)
 70. Al Khadhraa, Hayy Al-Jami'a (Al-Jamia'a)
 71. Al-Adel (Al-Adil)
 72. Ghazaliya East
 73. Ghazaliya West
 74. Baghdad International Airport, Abu Ghraib Road

Al Rashid District

 75. Dora Refinery
 76. Dora, Athureen, Tua'ma
 77. Al-Saydiya, Dhubat
 78. Al-Saydiya
 79. Bajas, Hayy Al-A'amel (Amil)
 80. Hayy Al-Jihad
 81. Al-Atiba'a
 82. Ajnadin, Hayy Al-Shurtta (Shurta) 4th & 5th
 83. Al-Furat
 84. Suwaib, Makasib
 85. Resala, Qertan, Ewainy West
 86. Ewairij
 87. Saha (Seha), Hor Rejab
 88. Mechanic, Asia
 89. Bo'aitha

Formation of the current system
The City of Baghdad has 89 official neighborhoods within 9 districts. These official subdivisions of the city served as administrative centers for the delivery of municipal services but until 2003 had no political function. Beginning in April 2003, the U.S. controlled Coalition Provisional Authority (CPA) began the process of creating new functions for these subdivisions. The process initially focused on the election of neighborhood councils in the official neighborhoods, elected by neighborhood caucuses. The CPA convened a series of meetings in each neighborhood to explain local government, to describe the caucus election process and to encourage participants to spread the word and bring friends, relatives and neighbors to subsequent meetings. Each neighborhood process ultimately ended with a final meeting where candidates for the new neighborhood councils identified themselves and asked their neighbors to vote for them. Once all 88 (later increased to 89) neighborhood councils were in place, each neighborhood council elected representatives from among their members to serve on one of the city's nine district councils. The number of neighborhood representatives on a district council is based upon the neighborhood’s population. The next step was to have each of the nine district councils elect representatives from their membership to serve on the 37 member Baghdad City Council. This three-tier system of local government connected the people of Baghdad to the central government through their representatives from the neighborhood, through the district, and up to the city council.

 
The same process was used to provide representative councils for the other communities in Baghdad Governorate outside of the city itself. There, local councils were elected from 20 neighborhoods (Nahia) and these councils elected representatives from their members to serve on six district councils (Qada). As within the city, the district councils then elected representatives from among their members to serve on the 35 member Baghdad Regional Council.

The final step in the establishment of the system of local government for Baghdad Province was the election of the Baghdad Provincial Council. As before, the representatives to the Provincial Council were elected by their peers from the lower councils in numbers proportional to the population of the districts they represent. The 41 member Provincial Council took office in February 2004 and served until national elections held in January 2005, when a new Provincial Council was elected.

This system of 127 separate councils may seem overly cumbersome but Baghdad Province is home to approximately seven million people. At the lowest level, the neighborhood councils, each council represents an average of 74,000 people.

See also

 Districts of Iraq

References

External links
 iraqimage.com
 Bill Roggio report map
 U.S. News & World Report map

 
Government of Iraq